Yoon Young-Nae (born 26 September 1952) is a Korean former volleyball player who competed in the 1972 Summer Olympics and in the 1976 Summer Olympics.

References

1952 births
Living people
South Korean women's volleyball players
Olympic volleyball players of South Korea
Volleyball players at the 1972 Summer Olympics
Volleyball players at the 1976 Summer Olympics
Olympic bronze medalists for South Korea
Medalists at the 1976 Summer Olympics
Olympic medalists in volleyball
Place of birth missing (living people)
Asian Games medalists in volleyball
Volleyball players at the 1970 Asian Games
Volleyball players at the 1978 Asian Games
Medalists at the 1970 Asian Games
Medalists at the 1978 Asian Games
Asian Games silver medalists for South Korea
Asian Games bronze medalists for South Korea